The Clarinet Sonatas, Op. 120, Nos. 1 and 2, are a pair of works written for clarinet and piano by the Romantic composer Johannes Brahms. They were written in 1894 and are dedicated to the clarinetist Richard Mühlfeld. The sonatas stem from a period late in Brahms's life where he discovered the beauty of the sound and tonal colour of the clarinet. The form of the clarinet sonata was largely undeveloped until after the completion of these sonatas, after which the combination of clarinet and piano was more readily used in composers’ new works. These were the last chamber pieces Brahms wrote before his death and are considered two of the great masterpieces in the clarinet repertoire. Brahms also produced a frequently performed transcription of these works for viola with alterations to better suit the instrument.

Background
By 1890, Brahms vowed to retire from composing, but his promise was short lived. In January 1891 he made a trip to Meiningen for an arts festival and was captivated by performances of Carl Maria von Weber's Clarinet Concerto No. 1 and the Mozart Clarinet Quintet. The solo clarinetist was Richard Mühlfeld, and Brahms began a fond friendship with the man whom he so admired. The beautiful tone of “Fräulein Klarinette” (as Brahms would nickname Mühlfeld) inspired him to begin composing again less than a year after he retired. 
The fruits of their friendship were four remarkable additions to the still modest clarinet repertoire of that time, including the trio in A minor for clarinet, cello and piano Op 114 (1891), the B minor quintet for clarinet and strings, Op. 115 (1891), and two clarinet sonatas. In July 1894, at his Bad Ischl retreat, Brahms completed the sonatas. He wrote to Mühlfeld on August 26, inviting him to Bad Ischl, to perform them, stating cryptically that "it would be splendid if you brought your B clarinet."  As Muhlfeld had other commitments that summer, he delayed responding, but went to Vienna in September to meet Brahms and to acquaint himself with the two sonatas. They were first performed (by Brahms and Mühlfeld) privately for Duke Georg and his family in September of that year. Brahms and Mühlfeld then performed them for Clara Schumann in November 1894, before their public premieres on January 7, 1895. Brahms’ experience in writing his Clarinet Quintet three years earlier led him to compose the sonatas for clarinet and piano because he preferred the sound over that of clarinet with strings. The keys of the sonatas—F minor and E major—correspond to the keys of the two clarinet concertos which Weber composed more than eighty years earlier.

Sonata No. 1 in F minor

Structure
Sonata No. 1 consists of the following movements:

I. Allegro appassionato
F minor, in  time

The first movement is in sonata form. It begins with a solo piano introduction in three parallel octaves, outlining a recurring motif throughout the movement. The clarinet then enters with the slurred first theme. The piano takes over the theme, with the clarinet playing more of an embellishing role. It was normal in clarinet music before the sonatas for the soloist to play mostly, if not always, the melody. Brahms did not reduce the scope of the piano part to accommodate for the clarinet, but created a more equal and harmonious relationship between soloist and accompanist.  The quiet transition between the two themes is in D major and features staggered entrances between the hands of the piano. The second theme introduces dotted rhythms and is marked marcato, contrasting with the first theme. It passes through many key areas quickly before finally resting on C minor.

The development begins by expanding on ideas heard in the introduction and transition. The piano plays with staggered hand entrances and joins the clarinet in recalling the second bar of the introduction. The music makes a false movement towards A major, instead landing on E major. A subito forte evokes the second theme combined with staggered entrances from both piano hands and clarinet. The second theme is finally presented and leads to the recapitulation.

The introduction is restated forte in the key of C minor. Brahms brings the key back around to F minor and the first theme, transition, and second theme are heard again. Tonally, this section does not stray far from F although the music goes through major and minor sections. A final statement of the first theme leads into the coda, marked Sostenuto ed espressivo. The coda is slower in tempo and based on material from the introduction. The movement ends quietly in F major.

II. Andante un poco adagio
A major, in  time

The second movement is in ternary form. The clarinet introduces a simple descending theme decorated with turns. The piano writing is sparse in the first theme area. This A section is repeated twice, once ending on a half cadence and the other with a perfect authentic cadence on the home key of A major.

The B section is characterized by faster rhythmic and harmonic motion. The piano plays sixteenth notes outlining the harmonies while the clarinet continues playing a slurred melody. The harmony descends in an imitation of the A section melody through the keys D major, C major, and A major. The clarinet gets a chance to play the sixteenth notes that the piano had before the modulation to E major.

The A melody returns in the piano in the “wrong” key of E major, moves to C major, and finally back to the A major. The A section is then restated in its entirety with a more active piano accompaniment. A short interlude of sixteenth notes in the piano alludes to the B section and a final iteration of the melody ends the movement.

III. Allegretto grazioso
A major, in  time

The third movement is also in ternary form. The A section consists of an eight bar melody played by the clarinet, and then traded off to the piano with the clarinet lending supporting lines. A forte repeated section inverts the melody and the second ending leads to the B section.

The piano takes up a descending line syncopated between the two hands while the clarinet adds a low supporting line confined within the space of a minor third. Another repeated section lets the clarinet play the descending melody. After the repeat, the melody from the A section returns and ends the movement.

IV. Vivace
F major, alla breve

The movement begins with three accented Fs in a piano introduction serving as a sort of call to identify the first theme. The A theme is marked leggero in the clarinet and is mostly eighth notes in stepwise motion. The contrasting B theme is made up of quarter note triplets and is more slurred and leisurely. After a bombastic return to A′, the quiet C theme is played in the piano and then handed off to the clarinet. The clarinet then plays the “call” from the introduction while the piano states the B theme again. Finally, the final A″ section ends with a coda and the sonata is finished in F major.

Arrangements and transcriptions
 Luciano Berio is known to have orchestrated and reworked the whole sonata for orchestra in 1986. The resulting composition was entitled as Op. 120, No. 1, as a clear reference to the original work's catalogue number.

Sonata No. 2 in E major

Sonata No. 2 is in three movements.

Notes

References
Swafford, Jan (1997), Johannes Brahms: A biography, New York: Alfred A. Knopf, 
Musgrave, Michael (1985), The Music of Brahms, Oxford: Clarendon Press, 
Lawson, Colin (1998), "Brahms: Clarinet Quintet", Cambridge: Cambridge University Press,

External links

Performance of Clarinet Sonata No. 1 by Richard Stoltzman (clarinet) and David Deveau (piano) from the Isabella Stewart Gardner Museum in MP3 format

Chamber music by Johannes Brahms
Brahms clarinet sonatas
1894 compositions
Compositions in F minor
Compositions in E-flat major